"Knokk 'Em Down" is a 2005 single by Swedish glam metal band Crashdïet. This was the second single for the band and it appears on their 2005 debut album, Rest in Sleaze. A music video was shot for the song. The song debuted at #57 on the Swedish singles chart.

Track listing
Knokk 'Em Down
Tikket

Personnel
Dave Lepard - vocals, guitar
Martin Sweet - Guitar
Peter London - Bass guitar
Eric Young - drums

External links
Official Crashdiet website

2005 singles
Songs written by Dave Lepard
Crashdïet songs
2005 songs